Gdynia Redłowo railway station is a railway station serving the city of Gdynia, in the Pomeranian Voivodeship, Poland. The station is located on the Gdańsk Śródmieście–Rumia railway. The train services are operated by SKM Tricity.

Train services
The station is served by the following service(s):

Szybka Kolej Miejska services (SKM) (Lębork -) Wejherowo - Reda - Rumia - Gdynia - Sopot - Gdansk

Bus services
The station is an interchange to buses and trolleybuses to districts such as Wielki Kack, Karwiny, Dąbrowa, Witomino-Leśniczówka and Witomino-Radiostacja.

References 

 This article is based upon a translation of the Polish language version as of November 2016.

External links

Railway stations served by Szybka Kolej Miejska (Tricity)
Redlowo